Afghan may refer to:

Something of or related to Afghanistan, a country in Southern-Central Asia
Afghans, people or citizens of Afghanistan, typically of any ethnicity
Afghan (ethnonym), the historic term applied strictly to people of the Pashtun ethnicity
Ethnic groups in Afghanistan, people of various ethnicities that are nationally Afghan
Afghan Hound, a dog breed originating in the mountainous regions of Afghanistan and the surrounding regions of Central Asia
Afghan (blanket)
Afghan coat
Afghan cuisine

People
 Sediq Afghan (born 1958), Afghan philosopher
 Asghar Afghan (born 1987), former Afghan cricketer
 Afgansyah Reza (born 1989), Indonesian musician also known as "Afgan"
 Afghan Muhammad (died 1648), Afghan khan in modern day Russia
 Azad Khan Afghan (died 1781), Afghan commander and ruler

Places
 Afghan, Iran, a village in Sistan and Baluchestan Province, Iran

Other uses
 Afghan (Australia), camel drivers from Afghanistan and Pakistan who came to the Australian outback
 Afghan (biscuit)
 Afghan rug
 Afghan Girl
 The Afghan, a 2006 thriller novel by Frederick Forsyth
 The Ghan, a passenger train in Australia
 Afghan Breakdown, 1991 Soviet film

See also 

 
 
 Afghani (disambiguation)
 Ghan (disambiguation)

Language and nationality disambiguation pages